Jing'an Park is a park located at the Western section of Nanjing Road, just opposite the Jing'an Temple in Shanghai, China. It occupies the site of the former Bubbling Well Road Cemetery.

Location
The park is located at the crossing of Nanjing Road and Changshu Road, extending over the area south of Jing'an Temple Station.

Bubbling Well Cemetery

What today constitutes the Western section of Nanjing Road was originally called Bubbling Well Road. Bubbling Well Cemetery was opened in 1898 and closed in 1951 with redevelopment into a park taking place in 1954.  There were approximately 5,500 total burials and approximately 1,350  cremation conducted in the cemetery. In the winter of 1953-54 the cemetery was reclaimed for redevelopment.  There were 43 British naval and 13 British military graves. In the process of removal of the military graves the Chinese authorities deliberately obliterated all details other than names  The lane of plane trees down Jing'an Park's centre is a surviving feature of the former cemetery.  

The following people of note were buried or cremated in the cemetery:

 Edward Bamford VC, DSO
 Nicholas John Hannen, Chief Justice of the British Supreme Court for China and Corea (cremation)
 Laura Askew Haygood, American Methodist missionary and educator
 Cecil Holliday, former chairman of the Shanghai Municipal Council
 John Prentice, former chairman of the Shanghai Municipal Council
 Hiram Parkes Wilkinson, Crown Advocate of the British Supreme Court for China
 Dr. William O'Hara, husband of actress May de Sousa
 William Wirt Lockwood, General Secretary of the Shanghai Young Men's Christian Association

References

History of Shanghai
Parks in Shanghai
Tourist attractions in Shanghai
Jing'an District
Cemeteries in Shanghai